Tank Upper Secondary School was an upper secondary school in the centre of Bergen, Norway.

The school opened in 1850 as Tank School (Den Tankske Skole), funded by an endowment established by merchant Hans Tank and his wife around fifty years earlier. The school closed in 2014 after it was merged with Bergen Handelsgymnasium and Bjørgvin upper secondary school into the new Amalie Skram upper secondary school.

Notable alumni
Edvard Hagerup Grieg, composer
Harald Hove, politician
Peter Rosenkrantz Johnsen, journalist and author
Dagfinn Lyngbø, comedian
Arnulf Øverland, poet

References

External links
Official site

Secondary schools in Norway
Education in Bergen
Hordaland County Municipality
Educational institutions established in 1850
1850 establishments in Norway